Zierlein is a surname. Notable people with the surname include:

Lance Zierlein, American sports analyst and commentator
Larry Zierlein (born 1945), American football coach